Melithaeidae is a family of corals in the suborder Scleraxonia. Members of the family are commonly known as sea fans and are found on reefs in the tropical regions of the Indo-Pacific.

Description
Members of the family Melithaeidae are arborescent colonial corals forming fans, bushes or trees. The axis or main skeletal "trunk" is jointed, there being nodes, flexible horny joints, separated by internodes composed of hard, calcareous material. The branches divide dichotomously at the nodes and these are often swollen. The minute calcareous spicules in the flexible membrane called the mesoglea that covers the skeleton are called sclerites. The exact shape of these spicules is important for identification purposes and in this family there are a range of different sclerites including foliate capstans and spheroids, plain spindles, plain capstans and small and large clubs. Members of this family do not have the unicellular symbiotic algae Zooxanthellae that grows in the tissues of many other corals.

Genera
The World Register of Marine Species includes the following genera in the family:

Asperaxis Alderslade, 2007
Melithaea Milne-Edwards, 1857

References

 
Scleraxonia
Cnidarian families
Taxa named by John Edward Gray